Marcelino is a surname that originated in Spain. There are also several families with the Marcelino surname in Philippines, Portugal, and the Americas (North, Central, and South).

San Marcelino,  is a 1st class municipality in the province of Zambales, Philippines.
Flor Marcelino, (1951) Politician born in Manila, Philippines.
Malaya Marcelino, Canadian politician

Marcelino is also a first name given in Spanish and Portuguese:
Marcelino Bernal, (1962) Mexican association footballer  (var. Mexican clubs).
Marcelino Bolivar, (1964) Venezuelan boxer.
Marcelino Elena, (1971) Spanish association footballer (Gijón, Mallorca).
Marcelino de Oraá Lecumberri, (1788–1851) Basque Spanish military man and administrator.
Marcelino López, (1943–2001) Cuban American baseball pitcher.
Marcelino Menéndez y Pelayo, (1856–1912) Spanish scholar, historian.
Marcelino Martínez, (1940), is a former Spanish association footballer (Zaragoza).
Marcelino dos Santos, (1929) Mozambican poet, revolutionary and vice president.
Marcelino Teodoro (born 1970), Filipino politician
Marcelino García Toral, (1965) Spanish association footballer (Gijón, Santander, Levante) and manager (Gijón, Santander, ...)

See also
Miracle of Marcelino, a 1955 Spanish film
Marcelino Pan y Vino (TV series), a 2000 television animated series

Spanish masculine given names
Portuguese masculine given names
Filipino given names